Eucalyptus lansdowneana, commonly known as the crimson mallee or the red-flowered mallee box, is a species of slender stemmed, straggly mallee that is endemic to a restricted area of South Australia. It has rough, fibrous or flaky bark at the base, smooth, grey over creamy-white bark, lance-shaped adult leaves, flower buds in groups of seven, crimson flowers and barrel-shaped fruit.

Description
Flowering mainly occurs between August and October and the flowers are crimson, ageing to pink.

Taxonomy and naming
Eucalyptus lansdownea was first formally described in 1891 by Ferdinand von Mueller and John Ednie Brown in volume 9 of Brown's book, The forest flora of South Australia. The specific epithet (lansdowneana) honours Thomas Lansdowne Browne, who collected the type specimens.

In 1974, Clifford David Boomsma described Eucalyptus lansdownea subsp. albopurpurea in the journal South Australian Naturalist but in 2000, Dean Nicolle raised the subspecies to species level as E. albopurpurea. Eucalyptus albopurpurea has a larger, more robust habit, broader leaves, usually smaller buds and fruit and white, pink or purple flowers.

Distribution and habitat
Crimson mallee is restricted to the south western part of the Gawler Ranges where it grows in mallee vegetation on rocky outcrops and hilltops.

References

lansdowneana
Myrtales of Australia
Flora of South Australia
Plants described in 1891
Taxa named by Ferdinand von Mueller